South Dalton is a village in the East Riding of Yorkshire, England.

South Dalton forms part of the civil parish of Dalton Holme.

The village forms part the Dalton Estate, owned and managed by the Hotham family which has possessed land in the area for generations. The 18th-century hall is the home of Lord Hotham. The Dalton Estate office is within the village. The Estate houses are of rows of cottages and Tudor style houses, some with date plates dating as far back as 1706.

According to A Dictionary of British Place Names the village name derives from the Old English for a "farmstead or village in a valley." South Dalton is listed in the Domesday Book as "Delton". At the time of the survey the settlement was in the Hundred of Sneculfcros in the East Riding of Yorkshire. It contained twelve households, twelve villagers, and six ploughlands. In 1066 Ealdred, the Archbishop of York, held the Lordship, this transferring by 1086 to the canons of Beverley, with Thomas of Bayeux, the later Archbishop of York, as Tenant-in-chief to King William I. By 1260 the settlement name was recorded as "Suthdalton".

In 1823 South Dalton was a village and civil parish in the Wapentake of Harthill. Population at the time was 277. Occupations included twelve farmers, a shopkeeper, a boot & shoe maker, a carpenter & wheelwright, a blacksmith, and the landlord of The Board public house. A weaver was also the parish clerk. Three carriers operated between the village and Beverley once a week.

St Mary's Church

The church of St Mary was designated a Grade I listed building in 1968 and is now recorded in the National Heritage List for England, maintained by Historic England. It was designed by John Loughborough Pearson and built from 1858 to 1861 as a replacement for a brick structure.

Inside the church lie a number of graves of the Hotham family; the older monuments were transferred from the earlier church. There is a black and white marble monument in memory of Sir John Hotham, 2nd Baronet which is based on the Cecil tomb at Hatfield and dates from after 1697.  Sir John is represented in life, as a reclining knight in full armour, with his helmet and gauntlet beside him, and in death, as a skeleton. Supporting the four corners of the tomb are statues representing the cardinal virtues.

The organ is a three manual instrument by William Hill dating from 1877 with additions by the local Hull firm, Foster & Andrews, in 1897.

References

External links

Dalton Estate

Villages in the East Riding of Yorkshire